The Chamber of Deputies of San Juan Province is the unicameral legislative body of San Juan Province, in Argentina. It comprises 36 legislators, 17 of whom are directly elected in single-member districts corresponding to the 19 departments of San Juan, and 17 of whom are elected in a single province-wide multi-member district through proportional representation.

The Chamber of Deputies convened for the first time on 21 January 1821. Its powers and responsibilities are established in the provincial constitution. Elections to the chamber take place every four years, when the entirety of its members are renewed. The legislature is presided by the Vice Governor of San Juan, who is elected alongside the governor every four years.

The Chamber convenes in the provincial capital, the City of San Juan. The current legislative building was originally built in the 1950s as a hotel. It became the official seat of the legislature in 1984.

Since 2019, the president of the Chamber of Deputies has been Roberto Guillermo Gattoni, of the Justicialist Party. Gattoni was elected in the gubernatorial ticket of Sergio Uñac. The Justicialist Party counts with a majority in the chamber since the 2019 elections, while the largest opposition bloc is Production and Labour.

References

External links
 
Constitution of San Juan Province 

1821 establishments in Argentina
Politics of Argentina
San Juan Province, Argentina
San Juan